The Methodist Church of Marshall is a historic church off OK 74 in Marshall, Oklahoma.  It was added to the National Register in 1984.

The congregation was organized in 1895. Its building was constructed in 1898.

References

Methodist churches in Oklahoma
Churches on the National Register of Historic Places in Oklahoma
Carpenter Gothic church buildings in Oklahoma
Churches completed in 1898
Buildings and structures in Logan County, Oklahoma
National Register of Historic Places in Logan County, Oklahoma
1895 establishments in Oklahoma Territory